Maudaha is a city and a Municipal Board in Hamirpur district, Uttar Pradesh, India.

History
Maudaha district participated in the elections of 1937 which were conducted under the Government of India Act 1935. In order to organize activities of the Congress in the district Jawaharlal Nehru and Abul Kalam Azad visited Maudaha in 1937. With the outbreak of the Second World War in 1939, however, the Congress ministries resigned on the issue of India's forced participation in it.

Government
Maudaha is one of four tehsils of Hamirpur district of Indian State Uttar Pradesh. The town had been recognized as one of the Uttar Pradesh Legislative Assembly's region until 2012. Maudaha is a Nagar Palika Parishad city divided into 25 wards for which elections are held every 5 years.

During the local body elections in December 2017, three Grampanchayats- Sichauli Purva, Ragaul and Fatteh purva merged with the Maudaha Municipality, formally called Maudaha Nagar Palika.

Geography
It has an average elevation of 120 metres (393 feet).

Climate

Demographics
 India census, the Maudaha Nagar Palika Parishad has a population of 40,003 of which 21,266 are males while 18,737 are females. The population of Children with age of 0-6 is 5059 which is 12.65% of the total population of Maudaha (NPP). In Maudaha Nagar Palika Parishad, Female Sex Ratio is of 881 against the state average of 912. Moreover, Child Sex Ratio in Maudaha is around 868 compared to Uttar Pradesh state average of 902. The literacy rate of Maudaha city is 78.77% higher than the state average of 67.68%. In Maudaha, Male literacy is around 86.22% while the female literacy rate is 70.34%.

Maudaha Nagar Palika Parishad has total administration over 7,152 houses to which it supplies basic amenities like water and sewerage. It is also authorize to build roads within Nagar Palika Parishad limits and impose taxes on properties coming under its jurisdiction.

Economy

The economy of Maudaha is mostly dependent on farming and the region is in a drought-affected area. There is no large scale industry in the city apart from a few small scale industries. The city however, has a growing private commercial sector, mainly retail businesses.

Hindustan Unilever, J.K. Cements, and Rimjhim Ispat Ltd. have factories in Bharua Sumerpur village, which is 15 km from Maudaha.

Transport

Road transport

The available multiple modes of public transport in the city are taxis, cycle rickshaws, auto rickshaws.
National Highway 34 (India) passes through Maudaha which connects it to Kanpur and Sagar. Bundelkhand Expressway connects it to Agra, New Delhi and Chitrakoot. A district major road MD510B passes through Maudaha which connects it to Banda and Muskara. Apart from the long-distance services, there are many services to nearby places within the state. There are number of daily buses to Kanpur, Rath, Delhi, Sagar, Lucknow, Jhansi, Banda, in Uttar Pradesh and to many other states.

Railways
Maudaha is served by Ragaul railway station, a station, under the Jhansi railway division of the North Central Railway Zone. It is well connected by trains with cities like Kanpur, Lucknow, Bilaspur, Jabalpur, Raipur, Chitrakoot Dham (Karwi).

References

Cities and towns in Hamirpur district, Uttar Pradesh